The Whitten effect is  stimulation, by male pheromones, of synchronous estrus in a female population.

Social signals, or social stimuli, have an effect on reproduction in all mammals.  For certain female mice, the pheromones contained in the urine of male mice can  be such stimuli, inducing synchronous estrus.

When the pheromones contained in the urine of male mice stimulate synchronous estrus in a population of female mice, it is known as the Whitten effect. This is a phenomenon observed by Wesley K. Whitten (1956, 1966, 1968),  whereby male mouse pheromone-laden urine synchronizes the estrus cycle "among unisexually grouped females," and is an example of male-to-female pheromonal effects in mice, similar to the Bruce effect.

The Whitten effect occurs when a group of female mice are exposed to the urine produced by a male mouse. The male’s urine contains certain volatile, or airborne, pheromones that affect the hormonal processes of the females that control their reproductive status. A sexually mature and viable male must produce the urine,  as the pheromones that produce the Whitten effect are dependent on male sex hormones such as testosterone.

The female mice do not require direct contact with the male’s urine to produce the Whitten effect, as the pheromone contained in the urine is airborne and therefore is taken up by the females through their olfactory system. The reproductive cycle of female mice in isolation is approximately 4 to 5 days, and the reproductive cycles of grouped females are often longer and more irregular.  However, when grouped female mice are exposed to the pheromones contained in a male’s urine, the Whitten effect occurs, and the majority of the female mice will enter a new estrus cycle by the third day of exposure. However, there is little evidence for a similarly functioning vomeronasal, or olfactory, system (thought to be the sensory organ that initiates the Bruce, Vandenbergh, and Whitten effects) in humans.  These differences, in putative stimulus and neural pathway (as well as species observed), stringently distinguishes the Whitten and McClintock effect, as the latter does not posit a role for male pheromones.

See also 
 Bruce effect
 Lee–Boot effect
 McClintock effect
 Vandenbergh effect

References

Sources
 Journal code: 0375363

Ethology
Menstrual cycle